Quercus castaneifolia, the chestnut-leaved oak, is a species of oak in the turkey oak section Quercus sect. Cerris. It is native to the Caucasus and Alborz mountains of Iran, and resembles the closely related Turkey Oak in appearance.

Description
The acorns are very bitter, but are eaten by jays and pigeons; squirrels usually only eat them when other food sources have been exhausted.

Cultivation
The tree was introduced to England in 1846, but remains relatively rare in collections despite being a vigorous grower. A tree from the original introduction is at the Royal Botanic Gardens, Kew, another survives at the Harlow Carr arboretum in Yorkshire.

The cultivar Quercus castaneifolia 'Green Spire' has been selected for its erect growth.

Notable specimens
A specimen of Quercus castaneifolia found in the Hyrcanian forest of northern Iran on 29. April 2021 by Alireza Naqinezhad is considered to be the tallest oak in the world.
It has a height of 60.4m, a diameter of 4.9m, and a circumference of 22m.
The finding was published in a tweet by Pieter De Frenne, professor of forestry at the faculty of Bioscience Engineering at Ghent University.

References

castaneifolia
Trees of Western Asia
Trees of mild maritime climate
Trees of Mediterranean climate
Flora of Azerbaijan
Flora of Iran
Plants described in 1831